Cochylis posterana is a moth of the family Tortricidae. It is found in Europe, Iran and China (Gansu, Xinjiang).

The wingspan is 13–16 mm.

Larvae have been recorded feeding on Carduus nutans, Cirsium lanceolatum and Centaurea jacea.

Subspecies
Cochylis posterana posterana (Europe)
Cochylis posterana hyrcana (Toll, 1948) (Iran, China: Gansu, Xinjiang)

References

P
Moths of Asia
Moths of Europe
Moths of the Middle East
Insects of Central Asia
Biota of Xinjiang
Insects of Iran
Moths described in 1847